Houda Chaabi (born 7 July 1986) is an Algerian sports shooter. She competed in the women's 10 metre air rifle event at the 2020 Summer Olympics.

References

External links
 

1986 births
Living people
Algerian female sport shooters
Olympic shooters of Algeria
Shooters at the 2020 Summer Olympics
Place of birth missing (living people)
21st-century Algerian women